Vila Neitzel is a geographical district in the Brazilian municipality of Itueta, founded by Pomeranians.

The district was founded by German refugees during World War II.

In the district is currently headquartered Língua Mutter project, which has the goal of teaching and spreading the East Pomeranian dialect among the inhabitants of the district.

See also
German Brazilians

References

External links
Itueta, em Minas, abriga comunidade de descendentes de alemães

Neighbourhoods in Minas Gerais
German-Brazilian culture